IVV may refer to:

 IVV, symbol for the exchange-traded fund iShares S&P 500 Index
 Ivatan language, ISO 639 code
 Internationale Vereinigung für Vegetationskunde, former name of the International Association for Vegetation Science
 Istituto di virologia vegetale, an institute of the Italian National Research Council
  (International Federation of Popular Sports) a German-based sports federation originating from volksmarching or fitness walking
 IV&V, abbreviation for independent verification and validation, used to check a product, service, or system 
 IVV Femida, a Russian airline in list of airline codes